Đồng Lộc Junction (Vietnamese: ngã ba Đồng Lộc) was a strategic road T-junction at the beginning of the Ho Chi Minh trail which was extensively bombed by American forces during the Vietnam War. Although it is often referred to as a "crossroads" in English sources, a crossroads is ngã tư (4-junction), whereas a T-junction is ngã ba (3-junction). 

Đồng Lộc Junction is located in Đồng Lộc township of Can Lộc District, Hà Tĩnh Province, on the Ho Chi Minh trail through the Annamite Range (dãy núi Trường Sơn) at the intersection of Highway 15A and Route 2 Hà Tĩnh Province.

The crossroads is now mainly remembered for the memorial to ten young unmarried girls aged 17–22 who were youth volunteers helping with logistics at the T-junction. At noon on 24 July 1968, on the 15th day of bombing, a bomb fell very close to the mouth of the tunnel where the 10 girls were hiding killing them all. The story of the ten girls was made into a film Ngã ba Đồng Lộc The Girls at Dong Loc Crossroads (1997) directed by Lưu Trọng Ninh starring Thúy Hường, Hương Dung, Ngọc Dung, Yến Vy, and Xuân Bắc. 

The location today is a shrine.

References

Vietnam War sites
Roads in Vietnam
Vietnam War memorials
Monuments and memorials in Vietnam
Geography of Hà Tĩnh province